Masaka–Villa Maria–Bukomansimbi–Sembabule Road also Nyendo–Villa Maria–Bukomansimbi–Sembabule Road, is a road in the Central Region of Uganda, connecting the towns of Masaka in Masaka District, Villa Maria in Kalungu District, Bukomansimbi in Bukomansimbi District to Sembabule in Sembabule District.

Location

Overview
This road is the principal transport corridor between the districts of Masaka, Kalungu, Bukomansimbi and Sembabule. The road is under the jurisdiction of the Uganda National Roads Authority.

Upgrading to bitumen
After many years of being included in the annual budget speeches without action, work to upgrade the gravel road to class 2 bitumen finally began in February 2015. Construction work was contracted to the China Railway Number 3 Engineering Group Company Limited at a cost of UGX:239 billion. The  Masaka–Villa Maria section remains gravel surfaced.

See also
 List of roads in Uganda
 Economy of Uganda
 Transport in Uganda

References

External links
 Uganda National Road Authority Homepage
 Armed robbers steal Shs140 million from Chinese road contractors As of 28 October 2018.

Roads in Uganda
Masaka District
Bukomansimbi District
Sembabule District
Central Region, Uganda